The siege of Berat took place in July 1455 when the Albanian army of Skanderbeg attempted to capture the fortress in the Albanian city of Berat, which was held by Ottoman forces. The attempt resulted in a failure when an Ottoman relief army arrived and routed the besieging forces.

Background
When Skanderbeg began his rebellion, Berat belonged to the Albanian prince Theodore Muzaka. When in 1449 Theodore Muzaka was dying, he sent for Skanderbeg to take over the castle in the name of the League of Lezhë. Skanderbeg sent an Albanian detachment led by Pal Kuka, to claim the castle. In the meantime a force of Ottoman soldiers came from their garrison in Gjirokastër, quietly scaled the poorly guarded walls of Berat at night, slaughtered the Albanian garrison of about 500 soldiers, hanged the dying Theodore Muzaka, and claimed the castle, while the captain Pal Kuka was later ransomed. Berat was located on an important strategic position as it controlled much of southern Albania as well as the vital supply routes leading to southern Macedonia and Greece.

Siege 
Skanderbeg and his forces besieged the Ottoman-occupied castle and began pounding it with the help of the Aragonese artillery. The commander of the Ottoman garrison then proposed to hand over the city if no reinforcements would come for a month. Believing the situation was well in hand and that the castle would fall, Skanderbeg left with a sizable contingent of his army in the direction of Vlorë. Although he tutored his commanders, Skanderbeg could never bring them up to his level of knowledge in military affairs. His formal training and experience in Anatolia and his service with the Ottoman army proved to be valuable for the Albanian resistance against the Ottomans.

At the head of the remaining force he left Karl Muzaka Thopia, his brother-in-law, since Berat was formerly a possession of Muzaka's family. After a successful bombardment, the Ottoman commander of the garrison agreed to turn over the keys to the castle if the sultan had not sent reinforcements within a certain amount of time. This was a ploy to fool the Albanian forces into a false sense of security and delay any actions, giving reinforcements time to arrive.

Battle
The sultan sent an army of 20,000 troops led by Issa beg Evrenoz. The reinforcements surprised the Albanian army in mid-July, 1455. Only one Albanian commander, Vrana Konti (Kont Urani), managed to resist the initial Ottoman onslaught and pushed back several attacking waves. When Skanderbeg returned, however, the Ottoman relief force was repulsed. Despite this, the Albanians were exhausted and their numbers had dwindled to the point where the siege could not be continued, thus the army lifted the siege and retreated.

Around 6,000 of Skanderbeg's men died, including 800 men of a 1,000-man-strong contingent of Neapolitans from Alphonso V as experts in demolition, artillery, and siege warfare. The commander of the siege, Muzaka Thopia, also died during the conflict.

Aftermath
Skanderbeg himself was not at the battle, having moved southwest to inspect the routes to Vlorë and hinder a potential surprise attack from the garrison there. Upon hearing the news, he rushed back, but by the time of his arrival the battle was already over. Italian chronicles of the time describe Skanderbeg as performing feats of bravery “with sword and mace” and that many owed their life to his opportune intervention. The results at Berat were disastrous and badly crippled the Albanian resistance for a time. Berat remained in the hands of the Ottomans and was never again to be taken by the League.

Notes

References
 
 
 
 
 

Warfare by Skanderbeg
Berat 1455
Berat 1455
1455 in Europe
History of Berat
Berat
1455 in the Ottoman Empire